Jennifer "Jen" Wood (born c. 1976) is an American indie rock musician based in Seattle, Washington. A solo artist since 1996, she was previously a member of alternative rock band Tattle Tale.

Biography
In 1992, at the age of fifteen, Wood formed Tattle Tale with school friend Madigan Shive. The band released two albums, Tattle Tale in 1993 and Sew True in 1995. Their song "Glass Vase Cello Case" featured in the 1999 film But I'm a Cheerleader by Jamie Babbit.

In 1996, after the breakup of Tattle Tale, Wood went to Santa Cruz, California and recorded a number of songs which she released as No More Wading.

After recording Getting Past the Static, she moved back to Seattle.

In 2002, she appeared as a guest vocalist on the collaborative effort The Postal Service, providing the female vocals for the duet "Nothing Better" and backing vocals on "Such Great Heights." On July 18, 2013, she performed the former song live for the first time at the KeyArena with The Postal Service. She has also collaborated vocally with The Black Heart Procession and Joan of Arc, to name a few.

Her second full-length album, Finds You in Love (New Granada Records) was released on September 14, 2010 to critical acclaim.

On October 14, 2014, Wood released her third full-length album, Wilderness.

Discography
 1993: Tattle Tale (with Tattle Tale)
 1995: Sew True (with Tattle Tale)
 1996: No More Wading
 1997: Getting Past the Static (1997)
 2000: This Uncontainable Light (EP)
 2002: Traveling through Roots
 2003: Jen Wood (EP)
 2010: Finds You in Love
 2014: Wilderness

Compilation Tracks
 Tree Southern Polyvinyl Sampler: "Imperfect"
 Post-Marked Stamps Compilation: "Sheltering Arms for the Birds"
 Try For Summer, Plan For Fall: "Circus"
 New Atmosphere for the Future: U.S. Pop Life, Volume 3: "Underestimation"
 Zum Audio Volume 2: "Believe Her"

References

External links
 New Granada Records site

1970s births
Living people
American rock musicians
American rock songwriters
American women rock singers
Musicians from Seattle
Singer-songwriters from Washington (state)
21st-century American women singers
21st-century American singers